"Tap In" is a song by American rapper Saweetie, released on June 17, 2020, as the lead single from her upcoming debut studio album Pretty Bitch Music. The song samples rapper Too Short's signature 2006 single "Blow the Whistle", produced by Lil Jon. Too Short provides the intro on "Tap In". Produced and co-written by Dr. Luke, it marked Saweetie's second song to chart on the US Billboard Hot 100.

Background
"Tap In" marks Saweetie's first release without a feature since 2019's "My Type"; she explained she had to focus on her artist development because it was something she struggled with. Saweetie stated that Too Short is one of her favorite rappers, and she was concerned that he would not like the song, however she got his blessing for the sample. With both artists being from California's Bay Area, Saweetie explained: "If you listen to Bay Area hip-hop, it's very fly. It's not necessarily punchlines, but like a fly way of describing what's happening to us or how we're feeling. It's super conversational and very relatable". The song was first previewed on Saweetie's Instagram, and debuted two days later on Apple Music's Beats 1 Radio with Zane Lowe.

Saweetie has become known for sampling classic hip hop tracks; she also sampled Khia's "My Neck, My Back" on her debut single "Icy Girl". She explained her frequent use of samples: "My specialty is able to have an ear for a beat that would sound good if I flipped it or if I sampled it. Hip-hop is built on samples".

"Tap In" continued the resurgence of producer Dr. Luke, whose career came to standstill after singer Kesha accused him of sexual assault. Earlier in 2020, he produced Doja Cat's US number-one single "Say So". He also worked with Kim Petras and produced Juice Wrld's top ten single "Wishing Well".

Composition
"Tap In" flips the beat and the signature whistle sounds of "Blow the Whistle", with Too Short delivering the intro: "Don't ever stop if you want to be on top, bitch". Over a bouncy beat and "funky" bass and percussion, Saweetie raps about her wealth, dancing and her physical features.

Critical reception
Aaron Williams of Uproxx called the song an "energetic, party-ready bop" and said Saweetie sounds rejuvenated on the song. In a positive review, HotNewHipHops Mitch Findlay stated: "Taking to the infectious bass-driven groove, Saweetie breaks it down with a slick flow, revealing plenty of character as she slides into new and increasingly playful rhyme schemes", and concluded that "her confidence and infectious energy" is seemingly boundless. Travis Grier of Def Pen said the song highlights Saweetie's assets "straight from the beginning" and noted that she lacks no confidence "in any capacity". Vibe called it a "fresh new spin on an old classic". Conversely, Earmilks Hayley Tharp questioned whether Saweetie relies "on already established beats to resonate with listeners, or could this be a careful tactic to build her brand?" Tharpe further said Saweetie's verses in the song "leave much to be desired" and "while the hook is memorable, the repetitiveness makes up most of the song. This track's brevity mirrors her previous singles rapping about rich men, a slim waist, and a full derriere".

Music video
The song's official video was released along with the song, on June 17, 2020. Saweetie noted "There's choreo, the looks are crazy. My glam is just real cute" and said her image in the video is how she dressed in high school; baggy pants and a loose t-shirt. She sports claw-like red nails, long hair and bamboo earrings in the visual, which features high-energy dance choreography on an iced-out basketball court.

Remix
A remix featuring fellow American rappers Post Malone, DaBaby, and Jack Harlow was released on August 28, 2020. It was teased by Saweetie on social media ten days prior, on August 18, in which there was one featured artist for fans to guess, which was Post Malone.

Awards and nominations

Charts

Weekly charts

Year-end charts

Certifications

Release history

References

2020 singles
2020 songs
Saweetie songs
Post Malone songs
DaBaby songs
Jack Harlow songs
Song recordings produced by Dr. Luke
Songs written by Post Malone
Songs written by DaBaby
Songs written by Dr. Luke
Songs written by Lil Jon
Songs written by Theron Thomas
Songs written by LunchMoney Lewis
Songs written by Too Short
Warner Records singles
Songs written by Saweetie